Théodore Aubanel (Occitan:Teodòr Aubanèu; 26 March 1829 – 2 November 1886) was a Provençal poet. He was born in Avignon in a family of printers.

Aubanel started writing poetry in French but quickly switched to Provençal, due to the influence of Joseph Roumanille. He is known primarily for La Miougrano entreduberto (1860, The Split Pomegranate) and Li Fiho d'Avignoun (1885, The Young Ladies of Avignon), two collections of lyric poems.

He died in Avignon.

See also

 Provençal literature

References
Jean Albert Bédé and William Benbow Edgerton. The Columbia Dictionary of Modern European Literature. Columbia University Press, 1980. ; p. 36

External links

 Life of Aubanel on Notreprovence.fr

Occitan poets
19th-century French poets
1829 births
1886 deaths
Writers from Avignon
French male poets
19th-century French male writers
French-language Occitan writers
Provençal-language Occitan writers